Danjuma may refer to:

 Arnaut Danjuma (born 1997), Dutch professional footballer
 Caroline Danjuma (born 1975), Nigerian actress
 Christopher Danjuma, Nigerian football manager
 Daisy Ehanire Danjuma (born 1952), Nigerian politician 
 Danjuma Laah (born 1960), Nigerian politician
 Ernest Danjuma Enebi, brand design strategist
 Mohammed Danjuma Goje (born 1952), Nigerian politician
 Theophilus Danjuma (born 1938), Nigerian soldier, politician, multi-millionaire businessman and philanthropist